Oriented FAST and rotated BRIEF (ORB) is a fast robust local feature detector, first presented by Ethan Rublee et al. in 2011, that can be used in computer vision tasks like object recognition or 3D reconstruction. It is based on the FAST keypoint detector and a modified version of the visual descriptor BRIEF (Binary Robust Independent Elementary Features). Its aim is to provide a fast and efficient alternative to SIFT.

See also 
 Scale-invariant feature transform (SIFT)
 Gradient Location and Orientation Histogram
  LESH - Local Energy based Shape Histogram
 Blob detection
 Feature detection (computer vision)

References

External links 
 Tutorial on ORB

Feature detection (computer vision)